Music instructor may refer to:

 Music Instructor, a German electro-dance music project
 Music teacher, an instructor of music